Havensport is an unincorporated community in Fairfield County, in the U.S. state of Ohio.

History
Havensport was platted in 1831 by Isaac Havens when the canal was extended to that point.

References

Unincorporated communities in Fairfield County, Ohio
Unincorporated communities in Ohio